Cosimo Cannito (born 10 April 1951) is an Italian politician, mayor of Barletta from 2018 to 2021 and again since 2022.

Biography 
Former member of the Italian Socialist Party, Cannito ran as an independent for the office of Mayor of Barletta at the 2018 Italian local elections, supported by a centre-right coalition. He won and took office on 15 June 2018.

On 13 October 2021, Cannito was ousted from the office of mayor by the majority of the comunal councilors, being later re-elected mayor at the 2022 elections.

See also
2018 Italian local elections
2022 Italian local elections
List of mayors of Barletta

References

External links
 

1951 births
Living people
Mayors of places in Apulia
People from Barletta
University of Naples Federico II alumni